Nsit Ibom is a Nigerian local government area located within central Akwa Ibom State and sharing boundaries with Ibesikpo Asutan, Etinan, Nsit Ubium and Uyo Local Government Areas. The people of Nsit Ibom are of the Ibibio ethnic extraction.

Nsit Ibom has a male population of 57,750 and a female population of 50,861 for aa total of 108,611 according to the 2006 National Census.

September 1991
In September 1991, the present Nsit Ibom Local Government Area was carved out leaving Nsit Ubium with its present two clans — Nsit and Ubium with 65 recognised villages and some other villages which are in existence.

Urban Communities
Nsit Ibom comprises the following urban communities: Afaha Offiong, Edeobom, Oboyo Ikot Ita, Oboetim Ikot Ekong, Obio Okpok, Obo Ntong, Ikot Obok, Obo Etok, ikot enwene, Asang and Okukok. It has 2 sub-clans: Asanga and Mbiaso. The Akwa Ibom State College of Education (AKSCOE), is located at Afaha Nsit, Mbiaso. The late Bishop D. J. Umondak, a Bishop of the Christ Holy Sanctified Church and the founder of Nsit Peoples Grammar School, Afaha Offiong hailed from this local government.

Nsit Ibom has its headquarters in Afaha Offiong. I'm not in the name of this Village oboetim ikot etim

Political Background 
Nsit Ibom presently has a new political dispensation consisting of youths and wealthy personalities enhancing development. The LGA Chairman Elder Joshua, had been working hand in hand with the people of Nsit Ibom towards a strategic development. He also wants to reunite the People into one PDP group. Nsit Ibom has also developed from grassroot level, which is being used to disseminate the dividends of democracy to the poor people.

References

Local Government Areas in Akwa Ibom State